Alexander Hollins (born November 24, 1996) is an American gridiron football wide receiver for the BC Lions of the Canadian Football League (CFL). He played college football for Eastern Illinois. Hollins has also been a member of the Minnesota Vikings and Cleveland Browns.

Early life and high school
Hollins grew up in Yazoo City, Mississippi and attended Yazoo County High School. As a senior, he had 64 receptions for 1,346 yards and 15 touchdowns.

College career
Hollins began his collegiate career at Copiah–Lincoln Community College. He caught 11 passes for 214 yards and three touchdowns as a sophomore before transferring to Eastern Illinois University for the final two years of his NCAA eligibility.

In his first season with the Panthers, Hollins led the team with 47 receptions for 694 yards and seven touchdowns. As a senior, he caught 80 passes for 1,102 yards and 16 touchdowns and was named first-team All-Ohio Valley Conference. Hollins had 127 receptions, 1,796 yards and 23 touchdowns in 22 games at Eastern Illinois.

Professional career

Minnesota Vikings
Hollins signed with the Minnesota Vikings as an undrafted free agent on April 29, 2019. He was waived by the team at the end of training camp during final roster cuts. Hollins was re-signed by the Vikings to their practice squad on September 12, 2019. Hollins was promoted to the Vikings active roster on December 2, 2019. Hollins played in four games as a rookie and caught two passes for 46 yards in the Vikings' final regular season game against the Chicago Bears.

Hollins was waived by the Vikings on September 5, 2020 and signed to the practice squad the next day.

Cleveland Browns
Hollins was signed off the Vikings' practice squad to the Cleveland Browns' active roster on December 28, 2020. The Browns waived Hollins on August 23, 2021. He was re-signed to the practice squad on December 15, 2021. The Browns waived Hollins off their practice squad on December 21, 2021.

BC Lions 
Hollins signed with the BC Lions of the Canadian Football League (CFL) on March 1, 2022. He made his CFL debut on October 8, 2022, where he had three catches for 47 yards and one touchdown against the Toronto Argonauts.

References

External links
BC Lions bio
Eastern Illinois Panthers bio
Minnesota Vikings bio

1996 births
Living people
American football wide receivers
Minnesota Vikings players
Cleveland Browns players
BC Lions players
Players of American football from Mississippi
Eastern Illinois Panthers football players
Copiah-Lincoln Wolfpack football players
People from Yazoo County, Mississippi